Apple-Oids (also written as Apple-oids) is a clone of Atari, Inc.'s Asteroids arcade game written by Tom Luhrs for the Apple II and published by California Pacific in 1980. The asteroids in Apple-oids are in the shape of apples.

Gameplay
The ship is rotated with the paddle knob and propelled forward with the paddle button. Firing is done via the keyboard, with the asterisk key. Pressing any other key warps the ship to a random location—a.k.a. hyperspace.

Reception
Forrest Johnson reviewed Apple-Oids in The Space Gamer No. 42. Johnson commented that "I have never figured out why anyone would send a perfectly good ship to shoot at asteroids, but if that's your scene, you will enjoy this game".

In a Creative Computing review alongside The Asteroid Field and Asteron, the authors concluded: "For those who like Asteroids, any of these three games is a good choice".

References

External links
Softalk review
Review in Creative Computing
Review in Peelings II

1980 video games
Apple II games
Apple II-only games
California Pacific Computer Company games
Multidirectional shooters
Video game clones
Video games developed in the United States